Stade Gaston Gérard is a multi-use stadium in Dijon, France.  It is used mostly for football matches and is the home stadium of Dijon FCO. The stadium is able to hold 15,995 people.

A stadium renovation began in 2016, intended to increase the capacity to 20,000 seats. Completion of the renovation is expected in the summer of 2017.  The architect for the project is Jean Guervilly and the overall cost is 19 million euros.

References

External links
Dijon stadium entry

Football venues in France
Athletics (track and field) venues in France
Dijon FCO
Sports venues in Côte-d'Or
Sports venues completed in 1934
1934 establishments in France